Zeitschrift für Naturforschung C: A Journal of Biosciences is a monthly peer-reviewed scientific journal. It covers "all areas of animal and plant physiology, all aspects of biochemistry, neurobiology, virology and molecular genetics". Historically, contributions were accepted in either German or English, but the current requirement is for manuscripts to be written in English.

History 
The Zeitschrift für Naturforschung (English: Journal for Nature Research) was established in 1946 and split into two parts (A and B) in 1947. Part C was established in 1973, removing coverage of the biosciences from part B. Since its establishment, the titles used for Part C have been:
 Zeitschrift für Naturforschung. Teil C, Biochemie, Biophysik, Biologie, Virologie (1973)
 Zeitschrift für Naturforschung. Section C, Biosciences (1974–1983)
 Zeitschrift für Naturforschung. Section C, A European Journal of Biosciences (1984–1985)
 Zeitschrift für Naturforschung. C, A Journal of Biosciences (1986–present)

References

External links 
 

Monthly journals
Publications established in 1973
English-language journals
Biology journals
De Gruyter academic journals